Pazin is a town in western Croatia, the administrative seat of Istria County. It is known for the medieval Pazin Castle, the former residence of the Istrian margraves.

Geography
The town had a population of 8,638 in 2011, of which 4,386 lived in the urban settlement. In 1991 it was made the capital of the county for its location in the geographical centre of the Istrian peninsula and in order to boost the development of its interior territories.

History

Pazin was built in an area rich in history and inhabited since ancient times. Just to its southeast lie Gallignana (Gračišče), castrum Callinianum in Roman times, and Pedena (Pićan), which was settled by the Histri, and then became a strategically important Roman military settlement under the name Petina. Some historians also link it to Pucinium, an unidentified fortification in central Istria, whose wine was famous even at the Roman court, with Livia, wife of Emperor Augustus, believing that her longevity was due to it. Just to the north of Pazin lies Draguccio (Draguć), formerly part of the County of Pazin as well as the Pazin county, which was a Roman fortification, and where numerous Roman archaeological finds were uncovered. The areas of Buzet (Pinguente) and Roč (Rozzo, an important Roman castrum since the 2nd century BC), to the north of Pazin, are rich in Roman finds.

The current settlement of Pazin originated with the houses built around a castle built by Germanic rulers. These were the houses of the family relatives and feudal settlers, to which were later added those of the foreign artisans, who offered their services to the lords of the castle as well as their employees and subjects. Thus a little burg developed, which was greatly developed when Pazin was enfeoffed to the bishops of Parezo (Poreč) and the town became the capital and center of the County of Pazin. Thus the small burg increased its population, both with commoners and nobles, who embellished it with new buildings, such as the hospice founded by Giovanni Mosconi, then the captain of Pazin. 

Pazin was first mentioned as Castrum Pisinum in a 983 deed regarding a donation by Emperor Otto II to the Diocese of Poreč. It then belonged to the Imperial March of Istria, which had originally been under the suzerainty of the newly established Duchy of Carinthia in 976, but separated together with the March of Carniola in 1040.

In the 12th century Mitterburg Castle was in possession of the Lower Carniolan count Meinhard of Schwarzenburg, who held the office of a vogt of the Poreč bishops (in Latin documents he is known as Cernogradus), and established the Pazin County (earldom). Upon his death, Pazin was inherited by his son-in-law Count Engelbert III of Gorizia (Görz) in 1186.

While most of Istria had gradually been annexed by Venice, Engelbert's descendant Count Albert III of Gorizia in 1374 bequested his Mitterburg estates to the Austrian House of Habsburg, who attached them to their Duchy of Carniola and gave it out in fief to various families, the last of which was the comital House of Montecuccoli from 1766.

Pazin and the surrounding areas were invaded multiple times by the Turks. These attacks intensified in the 1460s and 1470s. In 1463, Ivan Frankopan devastated   Cerovlje and Zarečje before heading to the castle of Pazin. Eventually, however, he didn't attack it, heading instead to the less protected Kašćerga and Sovinjak.

In 1476 the Turks struck the heartland of the towns of Pazin and Beram, with the people of Beram later claiming to have captured and killed all the members of a band of Turkish raiders (akindjis). Both the Turks and the Venetians attacked the town and destroyed the settlement around the castle during Austrian times. After the town passed to Venice, the Uskoks and Austrians gave it the same treatment.

In 1501, the Turks encamped in the vicinity of Lindar. In the 19th century, the place where they encamped was still known as the Monte dei Turchi ("Mount of the Turks"). The last Ottoman incursion in Istria occurred in Pazin in 1511.

In 1508, during the War of the League of Cambrai, the city was conquered by Venetian forces under Bartolomeo d'Alviano, and annexed by the Republic of Venice. It remained under Venetian rule until 1509. During its time under the Serenissima, Francesco Loredan was the castellan of the fortress, while Secondo de Cà Pesaro served in the position of captain of Pazin, as provveditore of the Republic of Venice.

The Slavs occupied the countryside around Pazin since the 9th century; they worked for the German landowners, who lived in the small fortresses and rocks, built on the edges of the cliffs. The Italians of Pisino trace their origins to the pre-existing Roman community living in the area of the County of Pazin, having resisted the expansion and assimilation of the newcomers. The Italian ethnicity in the County of Pazin was also kept alive and powered by the continuous contact and relationships with the nearby and strictly Italian communities of the Pola and Parenzo (Poreč) areas. 

As with the other Istrian counties, the notary and diplomatic language of Pazin remained Latin, in preference to the German language. The Istrian Demarcation (Razvod istarski) was written in 1325 in Croatian and in the Glagolitic script. Beside this debated document, there is only one document written in Croatian, a borders act between Cosliacco (Kožljak) and Moschienizze (Draga di Moschiena, Mošćenička Draga), which, however, was written in Croatian to please to chieftains of the Moschienizze area, subjects of the lords of Castua (Kastav), who didn't understand Latin. The only official language of the public and private documents of the County of Pazin was Latin, which in the 17th century was replaced by the Italian language. Even the acts and the registers from the captain administration were written in Latin, and then in Italian; German, which was still marginally used up to the 16th century, was used ever less, and finally disappeared in the 17th century.

By 1500, the city of Pazin, with a population of around 1500 people, was a small center of Italian life.  The head of the comune, and elected representative, did not bear the title of zupano (župan), but that of gastaldo. He was elected by the twelve counselors of the so-called Banca, and to operate needed the confirmation, or captain investment. His coadiutori (literally, coadjutors, collaborators) were usually called the giudici rettori. A public notary with Imperial authority acted as chancellor of the comune, stipulating its acts and contracts.

In 1890, through an artificial formation of the comune, the Austrian government was able to make the municipio fall to the Slavs, but the Italians "passionately defended the city on this and other occasions". The Italians kept in Pazin the headquarters of the Società politica istriana ("Istrian Political Society").

Until 1918, the town (under the name Pisino) was part of the Austrian monarchy (Austrian side after the compromise of 1867), seat of the district of the same name, one of the 11 Bezirkshauptmannschaften in the Austrian Littoral province.

In the same year, Pazin and all the Peninsula of Istria were transferred to the Kingdom of Italy. Benito Mussolini, then, introduced a fascist regime in Italy which, under the "Duce", began to Italianize the region. There were already many speakers of Italian and Istro-veneto in Pazin. In fact, Pazin was a very multicultural and multilingual town due to its location. Most of Istria became part of Yugoslavia after World War II with the Treaty of Paris in 1947. In September 1943, Pazin was attacked and bombarded by Yugoslav Partisans, and subsequently became part of modern day Croatia.

Education
Public education was neglected until the 16th century, when some priests started to teach the basics of Latin to the children of the local nobles and the bourgeoisie. Thereafter, the Pazin comune started to hire an Italian tutor (precettore italiano), who had also to serve as the organist of the Church of San Nicolò. The young Pazin students who wanted to pursue their studies in the humanities or philosophy would then move to Trieste or Fiume (Rijeka), where they would study in the local Jesuit colleges. Those who then wanted to continue with higher studies would often go to Padua.

Between 1646 and 1766, 73 youngsters from the County of Pazin attended the Jesuit college in Trieste, 41 of whom were from Pazin proper. The rector of the Jesuit college of Trieste, Giacomo Rampelli, was himself from Pazin.

In 1836, the first middle school in Pazin was opened. It operated until 1890 when it was moved to Pola (Pula). Teaching in the gymnasium of Pazin was only in the German language. In 1872, the Pazin deputy Francesco Costantini obtained, after long insistence, that also a lower gymnasium with the Italian language would be opened. The Slav parliamentarians of the Diet of Istria bought time until they received assurance that a Croatian gymnasium would also be opened. In 1899, by order of the Austrian government, the first Croatian gymnasium of Pazin was to be set up, which caused a "manifestation of Italianness" throughout the Julian March. There were manifestations throughout Istria and Trieste, which caused the diet to decree that also the Italian school would be opened in 1899.

The Italian Gymnasium of Pazin prospered, and its initial premises became too small. The consiglio comunale spotted a suitable area for the new building, but the then Austrian appointed podestà, a Croatian, opposed the purchase. The giunta provinciale intervened, voiding the decision of the podestà. The new school was opened in 1902, and before it was completed it was visited by Gabriele D'Annunzio, who was surprised by the civility of the Italian population, writing to his friend Francesco Salata:

The Italian gymnasium suffered during World War I, being requisitioned from August 1914 to October of that year. Three of its professors were called to arms, one of whom died on the battlefield. The school was evicted in 1915 and had to resettle in a private house. There were then the first political persecutions, with the arrest of one student and his family and the internment in concentration camp of a professor. It was eventually closed down by the Austrian authorities in 1916. Thirty-tree students of the gymnasium voluntarily participated in the war, four of whom died on the battlefield, and one in prison. In 1918, after the Bersaglieri entered the city, works to reopen the school, now dilapidated, were started.

It was named after Gian Rinaldo Carli since 1919. The building was further enlarged in 1926 and ten years later the boarding school Fabio Filzi was completed. The school was attended by students from allover Istria, notably Luigi Dallapiccola, Biagio Marin, Pierantonio Quarantotti Gambini, Mario and Licio Visintini, and Dario Leaone, the youngest victim of the foibe massacres. It produced many students who fought for Italy in various wars. It was bombed during World War II, on 4 October 1943, and finally dismantled in 1946, with the demolition of the structure. Its rector Eros Luginbuhl was slaughtered in Spalato (Split), by the Slavic communist partisans, while professor Teresita Bonicelli tragically disappeared. Teacher Norma Cossetto was tortured and infoibed in the foiba of Villa Surani; the principal of the school and rector of the boarding school, Vitale Berardinelli, and professor Antonio Natoli were killed by Yugoslav fleeing forces. 

Things got back to normal when the Germans reoccupied the city. Lessons restarted in the boarding school, which was shared with the German soldiers. The latter eventually evicted the school, which was again relocated to a private house. After the Yugoslav partisans entered the city in May 1945, one of their first actions was evicting the school from that private house. It was then relocated to another house. Pisino was then in ruin, but it was decided to restart the school in the boarding school, which was now inhabited by the Croatian clerics, who opposed this. Thanks to the mediation of Italian bishop Santin, the school was successfully restarted there.

A sanitary commission then visited the school, evicting it again, and themselves leaving the building in deplorable condition when they departed. The Italians cleaned the school and lessons were restarted, but an exhibition of the Croatian civilization was organized there and the school had to be closed again. It was then moved to the infirmary in the back of the boarding school. The school was later allowed to move back to the previous room, where the students had to put up without heating in the winter. In February, the rector Stefani was arrested in his home, brought to Albona (Labin) and then Abbazia (Opatija), where he miraculously managed to escape. The school was definitively closed in the summer of 1946.

Sights

The current town was mostly built beneath the medieval fortress. The present-day Pazin Castle was rebuilt in the 15th and 16th century and disassembled in the 18th and 19th. It has been a museum since the end of World War II.

The Pazin ponor (Pazinska jama/Foiba) located under the castle was partially explored by Édouard-Alfred Martel in 1896 and is the best example of karst hydrography and morphology in Istria. Castle and a gorge inspired Jules Verne for the novel Mathias Sandorf of 1885.

Settlements

The town's administrative area consists of 18 settlements with their respective populations:
 Beram, 234
 Bertoši, 325
 Brajkovići, 353
 Butoniga, 74
 Grdoselo, 119
 Heki, 469
 Ježenj, 141
 Kašćerga, 256
 Kršikla, 48
 Lindar, 402
 Lovrin, 364
 Pazin, 4,386
 Trviž, 409
 Vela Traba, 227
 Zabrežani, 426
 Zamask, 58
 Zamaski Dol, 51
 Zarečje, 296

Notable people
Leonard Bagni (1593–1650), priest, theologian, philosopher, physicist and missionary
Stojan Brajša (1888–1989), politician, lawyer and publicist
Dražen Bratulić (born 1971), actor
Renato Camus (1891–1971), architect
Antonio Chinappi (fl. 1710s), Doctor of Law
Francesco Costantini (1827–1899), lawyer, politician, mayor of Pazin (1880-1883)
Luigi Dallapiccola (1904–1975), composer
Gino De Finetti (1877–1955), painter
Juraj Dobrila (1812–1882), prelate, Bishop of Trieste
Fabio Filzi (1884–1916), Italian patriot
Pier Antonio Quarantotti Gambini (1910–1965), poet and writer
Tullio Ghersetich (born 1930), football player, played for Empoli, Fiorentina and Cagliari
Pasqualino Gobbi (17th century), Doctor of Law, Archdeacon of Pola
Vinko Jelovac (born 1948), international basketball player
Antun Kalac (1849–1919), poet, writer, priest
Ivan Matijašić (1916–2001), surgeon
Ilda Mizzan (died 1922), wife of Francesco Salata
Cristoforo Rampelli (17th century), jurist, captain of Pazin 1674-1686
Andrea Rapicio (1533–1573), jurist and prelate, Bishop of Trieste
Paul Stupar (1866–1928), naval officer, rear admiral
Radojka Šverko (born 1948), singer
Wilhelm Karl Emil Legler (1875–1951), painter, married in 1900 to Grete Schindler (sister of Alma Mahler)
Zanetto de Tassis (1450–1518), postmaser and courier
Ettore Uicich (1870–1915), irredentist, war volunteer
Josip Ujčić (1880–1964), prelate, Archbishop of Belgrade
Milan Zgrablić (born 1960), prelate

Climate
Climate in this area has high diurnal variations, and there is adequate rainfall year-round. The Köppen Climate Classification subtype for this climate is "Cfb". (Marine West Coast Climate).

References

Notes

External links

Pazin
Pazin portal
Pazin tourist board

 
Cities and towns in Croatia
Populated places in Istria County

10th-century establishments in Croatia
983 establishments